Dara Brown is a news anchor and senior producer for MSNBC.com. In 2006, she became an alternating host of Early Today on NBC and First Look on MSNBC.

Biography
Born Dara Evans Brown, she is the daughter of Karen (née Peterson) and David E. Brown. Dara has a son named Hayden, and a daughter named Victoria. As a child, Brown starred as the title character in the first national tour of the musical Annie. Brown graduated in 1983 from Wall High School in Wall Township, New Jersey. She is a graduate of New York University.

In 1999, she married Matthew Schmid in a Lutheran ceremony in Manasquan, New Jersey. The pair divorced in 2014.

References

Living people
American television news anchors
New York University alumni
Place of birth missing (living people)
Year of birth missing (living people)
American women television journalists
Wall High School (New Jersey) alumni
21st-century American women